Bathyphysa is a genus of siphonophores with 3 species in it.

References

Rhizophysidae
Hydrozoan genera